Jabłonowo-Maćkowięta  is a village in the administrative district of Gmina Janowiec Kościelny, within Nidzica County, Warmian-Masurian Voivodeship, in northern Poland.

References

Villages in Nidzica County